Lavanya Composite PU College is a pre-university college in Doddaballapura, Karnataka, India.

Courses 
The courses offered for PUC are

1. HEBA - 
2. HEPS -

References

Pre University colleges in Karnataka
Schools in Bangalore Rural district